Roy Noakes  (June 10, 1936 - February 9, 2002) was a British sculptor.

Early life
All of the young British sculptors who emerged in the 1950s had to engage with the towering international reputation of Henry Moore, and with the associated fallacy that direct carving was congruent with modernity. But at least the weight of Moore’s eminence was a crucial factor in provoking a reaction; Roy Noakes embarked on a fascinating and important journey in a very different direction.

Noakes dedicated his life to evolving an alternative sculptural language, one concerned with transience and lightness, to conveying fleeting appearances and gestures with economy of means - pared down, that is, in the sense of needing to eliminate everything that was extraneous to the inner energy of his forms. He worked outside the mainstream or avant-garde cultural orthodoxies of his time, neither a brutalist, a conceptualist, nor involved with smooth or shiny surfaces that were barriers to expressing the dynamic potential of his materials.

Noakes’s surfaces were active, not static. He aimed to breathe life into clay or bronze, to break down the distance between sculpture and the human form it signified, almost as though blood was coursing through its veins. In more than forty years of widely varied work, there is a common thread in that it all looks alive - spontaneous. However great was his struggle with intransigent substances, the viewer is not conscious of it.

The art world was in a rush in the 1960s, and with the privileging of ‘the new’. Innovations were confidently hyped that have proved alarmingly transient, the great ideas depressingly hollow. Noakes was too serious about exploring his ideas (as well as temperamentally indisposed) to court popularity. Fortunately, the core of his work remains to ensure that the art-historical record can now be put straight.

Career

Roy Noakes became a modeller by what was paradoxically the most efficient route - through his training as a carver. His achievement, driven by a refusal to be constrained by technique or bound by what he had learned, was based on his consummate skills as a craftsman.

He was born in Stepney in 1936, and although as a dyslexic he was unresponsive to formal education in the local secondary school, he was encouraged to draw by his father (who died when Roy was twelve). He was, fortuitously, apprenticed aged fifteen to the monumental masons, Anselm Odling, and ‘learned to carve roses and angels’. He also attended evening drawing classes at the City & Guilds of London Institute, Kennington, where among the teachers was the sculptor Bernard Sindall, RA, who, crucially, introduced him to the work of Giacomo Manzu and Medardo Rosso. In 1962 Noakes was awarded a Beckwith Scholarship by the Fishmonger’s Company and travelled to Italy. If his work sometimes invites comparisons with the unfinished sculptures of Michelangelo and late Rodin, Manzu’s reliefs and Rosso’s emotive impressionism were his chief inspirations.

Noakes changed his indentures to Gerald Giudici, a master carver who executed large-scale public sculptures by Sir Charles Wheeler, Gilbert Ledward and James Woodford; at the end of a long tradition of figurative sculpture, these free-standing monuments and architectural reliefs represented for the ‘modernist’ Patrick Heron, ‘spurious sentiment and meaningless skill’. Noakes might have agreed, but the path he took in the 1960s related neither to the ‘abstraction’ of Anthony Caro, Phillip King or William Tucker, nor to the vestigial figurative tradition represented by John Davis or the mechanistics of George Fullard and Eduardo Paolozzi.

After National Service in the Middle East he returned full-time to study at
Kennington (1958–62), making brilliantly animated figures in a burst of creativity pent up during his enforced two-year absence. Subsequently his career can be seen in terms of evolving a personal expressive language through modelling. Even in the most ostensibly passive of his late high-reliefs, in which the female figures have an almost fin-de-siecle dolorousness, there is energy and a snap-shot immediacy.

In a gesture that was typical of the man and his commitment to sculpture Noakes made, latterly, just one formal portrait, to show he could carve and to get it out of his system; this was a bust of Sir Anthony Eden (1996) of which there are versions in the Houses of Parliament and the Foreign Office. (The commissioned portraits of Instone Bloomfield and Alan Rawsthorne (1967, National Portrait Gallery ) capture their sitters’ spirits but make no concessions to traditional modelling). He continued to offer us the intangible and the elusive made forcefully but elegantly plastic.

Notes

Brief Bibliography

 Jack Lindsay Roy Noakes, The Archer Gallery 1975
 David Thomson Roy Noakes Sculpture, October Gallery, 1989
 Martin Harrison ‘Roy Noakes’ (2003) Roy Noakes Sculpture and Paper Works, Arts Council, 2009

Work in
 National Portrait Gallery 
 Arts Council England
 Mercer Gallery Harrogate
 Royal Northern College of Music
 The House of Commons
 The Foreign Office
 Private collections
 Design Androcles and the Lion Mermaid Theatre, Oct. 3rd. 1961, directed Frank Dunlop

External links
 North Yorkshire News 
 National Portrait Gallery 
 Some works can be viewed at 

2002 deaths
1936 births
20th-century British sculptors
British male sculptors
20th-century British male artists